Castilléjar is a municipality located in the province of Granada, Spain. It lies near the confluence of the Rio Galera and the Rio Guardal, approximately at the geographic centre of the Altiplano de Granada. According to the 2006 census (INE), the town has a population of 1619 inhabitants.

References

Municipalities in the Province of Granada